NGC 1847 is a young, massive star cluster in the bar of the Large Magellanic Cloud in the constellation Dorado.  It was discovered in 1835 by John Herschel with an 18.7-inch reflecting telescope.

References

External links
 

1847
Dorado (constellation)
Star clusters
Large Magellanic Cloud